Ptericoptus similis is a species of beetle in the family Cerambycidae. It was described by Breuning in 1939. It is known from Colombia and Venezuela.

References

Ptericoptus
Beetles described in 1939
Beetles of South America
Arthropods of Colombia